The Design Trilogy is the collective name of a series of three documentary films about design directed by film director Gary Hustwit.

The films are:
2007: Helvetica, on the famous typeface of the same name
2009: Objectified, on industrial design
2011: Urbanized, on architecture and urban design

Later in 2013 through crowdfunding, Hustwit began editing and compiling transcripts of the interviews with his subjects into a book. It was subsequently completed and released in 2015.

References

External links 
 Helvetica / Objectified / Urbanized: The Complete Interviews

Film series introduced in 2007
American film series
Documentary films about the visual arts
Trilogies